This list is of the Historic Sites of Japan located within the Prefecture of Tottori.

National Historic Sites
As of 1 July 2019, thirty-four Sites have been designated as being of national significance (including one *Special Historic Site); the San'indō spans the prefectural borders with Shimane.

Prefectural Historic Sites
As of 1 May 2018, nineteen Sites have been designated as being of prefectural importance.

Municipal Historic Sites
As of 1 May 2018, a further one hundred and twenty-two Sites have been designated as being of municipal importance.

See also
 Cultural Properties of Japan
 Hōki Province
 Inaba Province
 Tottori Prefectural Museum
 List of Cultural Properties of Japan - paintings (Tottori)
 List of Places of Scenic Beauty of Japan (Tottori)

References

External links
  Cultural Properties of Tottori Prefecture

Tottori Prefecture
 Tottori